AjaxView is an Ajax application profiler from Microsoft Research. It installs as a web server plug-in that modifies Ajax scripts on the fly to include performance monitoring and logging code.

References

External links 
AjaxView

Ajax (programming)
Microsoft Research